The Trade and Industry Committee of the African Union's Economic, Social and Cultural Council is established to bridge Africa with the rest of the world, execute the investment and trade policies to boost inter and intra Africa trade, connect with stakeholders, organisations, enterprises to strengthen the economic integration, execute Agenda 2063 Continental Frameworks, provide agile and effective service to key projects (African Continental Free Trade Area), conduct business data analysis regarding the global trading business and its influence, and  build Africa as a sustainable and powerful trading and industrial partner in the global arena during 2002, as a part of Africa Union, which was previously known as Organisation of African Unity (1963-1999).  The current Commissioner of this department is H.E. Albert Muchanga from Zambia (since 2017).  This department covers the units of trade, industry, customs cooperation, AfCFTA and Mining. It deals with the following:
Trade
Industry
Handcrafts
Customs and immigration matters

The Chairperson of the committee is Hassan Sumonu

Pan African Government Plans 
"Agreement Establishing the African Continental Free Trade Area" was initiated in May 2019 for African Continental Free Trade Area (AfCFTA). It focuses on activating a vigorous African trade market, attracting foreign investments, alleviating the infrastructure problems,  raising the employment rate, accelerating the custom fluency and enhancing the African Union's economy competitiveness as a whole meanwhile bridging the gap between African and non-African countries.

"Agenda 2063" is a blueprint aiming at developing pan-African area into a sustainable, inclusive, integrated, democratic and prosperous Africa through implementation plans and flagship projects.  However it has not highlighted how the intra Africa trade can improve the low value added-commodity exportation, diversified the Africa production and minimalizing the impact of post-colonization, during which the economical exports have been mineral and agricultural products rather than the finished high-tech commodity.

The Relation with US 
“An Original Bill To Extend the African Growth and Opportunity Act(AGOA), the Generalized System of Preferences, the Preferential Duty Treatment Program for Haiti”  grants the president the right to withdraw, suspend or limit duty-free treatment and revise the tariff, duty-free, exportation and investment articles on African areas.

Women’s role 

Women's role in African economy and how women can contribute to African trade in the discourse of economical planning and management. Women's  roles in African economic recovery has been undervalued or under addressed in the AfCFTA. It is the authorities’ responsibility to balance between genders and ensure both could benefit from the initiatives. In the original document, it has briefly put forward with the importance of gender equality, promotion of the gender equality idea and improvement of women service suppliers. The call for the women's engagement of African economy awakening is in a dire need through achieving the gender equality.

African Economy during COVID-19 
COVID-19 outbreak has slowed down the African economy development. As the strongest economy power in African region,   in February, Moody's Investors Service cut its 2020 economic growth forecast for South Africa to 0.7%. The whole nation would need to expect the effective government plans and reliable regimes to get the economy back on track.

See also 
 Economy of Africa

References 

Sectoral Cluster Committees of the Economic, Social and Cultural Council
Parliamentary committees on International Trade